Ferdinando (Ferrante) Sanseverino, Prince of Salerno (18 January 1507 – 1568) was an Italian condottiero.

Biography

Born in Naples, he was the son of Roberto II Sanseverino ( es ) and a noble girl from a Salerno family. Fernando Sanseverino was the fourth and last of the Sanseverino Princes of Salerno.

He fought for Emperor Charles V in Germany and France. He took part to Charles' incoronation in Bologna (1530), and was also present at the Conquest of Tunis (1535).

He was one of the imperial leaders in the fourth war against Francis I of France and fought at the battle of Ceresole (1544). Returning to Naples, he clashed with the Spanish viceroy Pedro de Toledo, due to his opposition to the institution of Holy Inquisition tribunals in the Kingdom of Naples. He therefore moved to France at the court of King Henry II, embracing the Huguenot faith. His Italian fiefs were given to the Gonzaga family.

Ferdinando Sanseverino died at Avignon, in France, in 1568.

Main accomplishments

He was a passionate supporter of contemporary theatre, and had one built within his palace in Naples.

His refusal to accept the Inquisition inside his possession in Salerno created a break between him and the Spanish government in southern Italy. Mainly as a consequence of this, Fernando Sanseverino was forced to exile in France.

There, he organized a naval attack of French ships against Naples and Salerno, but it failed because the allied Turkish fleet didn't show up.

His legacy in the Principality of Salerno was to bring to the southern Italian city (and the surrounding area) the ideas of the Italian Renaissance. He brought to Salerno Torquato Tasso for some years.

See also
 Salerno
 Principality of Salerno

External links
 Sanseverino

1507 births
1572 deaths
16th-century Neapolitan people
16th-century condottieri
Military leaders of the Italian Wars
Princes of Salerno